Ananes (sometimes called the Ananes Rocks) is a group of 7 small uninhabited islets in Greece's Aegean Sea, on the outskirts of the Cyclades island group. They are arranged in a crescent-like shape from southwest to due north, and comprise the south-westernmost islands of the Cyclades. The nearest islands are Milos and Antimilos to the northeast and Falkonera to the northwest.

The islands, along with the nearby similarly uninhabited Velopoula and Falkonera are protected areas under the Natura 2000 network.

References

Islands of Greece
Cyclades
Landforms of Milos (regional unit)
Islands of the South Aegean
Uninhabited islands of Greece